Ballesta is a Spanish surname. Notable people with the surname include:

Carlos Ballesta (born 1955), Spanish footballer and manager
Juan José Ballesta (born 1987), Spanish actor
Salva Ballesta (born 1975), Spanish footballer and manager

Spanish-language surnames